L'Indifférent is a 1717 oil on panel painting by Antoine Watteau, which entered the Louvre in the collection of Louis La Caze in 1869.

References

Further reading

External links
 L'Indifférent at the Web Gallery of Art

Paintings by Antoine Watteau
1710s paintings
Paintings in the Louvre by French artists